Melba Secondary College is a secondary school in Croydon, an eastern suburb of Melbourne, Victoria, Australia. Melba has a student population of approximately 560 students. The school's main campus is on Brentnall Road in Croydon.

History
During mid-2009, a merger of Maroondah and Croydon Secondary Colleges was proposed, following the goal of the Maroondah Education Coalition to improve secondary education. Despite poor community feedback around the merger, plans and a site study were completed to build a new school on the site of Maroondah Secondary College (the current Brentnall Road campus). The project was not funded in the 2010/2011 Victorian State Budget.

Despite the project's lack of funding, Croydon Secondary College and Maroondah Secondary College ceased operations as individual schools at the end of the 2011 school year. They merged under the temporary name Croydon Maroondah Secondary College for the start of the 2012 school year but continued operating at their respective campuses.

Melba Secondary College was then officially established with the Victorian Department of Education in January 2013. The founding principal was Terry Bennett, formerly the principal of Maroondah Secondary College, and also the principal of the temporary Croydon Maroondah Secondary College. The merger also attracted some students from the nearby Parkwood Secondary College which was closed at the end of the 2012 school year, although Parkwood was not officially involved in the merger.

Between 2013 and 2017, the old Croydon Secondary College site on Croydon Road served as the Junior Campus and the Maroondah Secondary College site on Brentnall Road was the Senior Campus.

Building works
Croydon and Maroondah Secondary Colleges were part of the Maroondah Education Coalition which was promised $100 million for redevelopment of school buildings by the then Labor state government, prior to the 2010 state election. The Labor government lost the 2010 election and the funding was not received, so the individual schools had no major upgrades until after the merger.

Prior to the 2014 state election, Melba College was promised $10 million for building upgrades by both major political parties. The school was then listed for building upgrades in the 2015/2016 Victorian State Budget as part of a $217 million statewide school upgrades project, and was provided $500,000 for planning. The proposed upgrade included an $18.4 million campus overhaul and constituted part of the Maroondah Education Plan. A further grant of $17.9 million was provided to the school in the 2016/2017 Victorian Budget.

The first stage of the school upgrade commenced in July 2015 and was completed in May 2018, based on recommendations from the study conducted in 2010. The new buildings were awarded Best School Project Above $5 million in the 2018 Victorian School Design Awards. With the first stage complete, the Junior Campus on the former Croydon Secondary College site was closed in late 2017. All students now study on the Brentnall Road campus, the former site of Maroondah Secondary College. Funding for Stage 2 of the building project was provided in the 2018/2019 Victorian State Budget, and this project is due for completion in July 2020.

Programs
The school competes within the School Sport Victoria (SSV) Maroondah Division, Eastern Metropolitan Region and State Levels for sporting events and carnivals such as athletics, swimming, cross-country and team sports.

The school has a comprehensive music program, with its school band participating in Melbourne's Anzac Day Parade annually.

Name
Melba Secondary College is named after Australia opera soprano Nellie Melba. The community was consulted for suggestions of names for the new school. The name Melba College is often used as an abbreviation.

Notable alumni
 Matthew Haanappel, Paralympic Games gold medalist

References

Secondary schools in Melbourne
Buildings and structures in the City of Maroondah
Educational institutions established in 2012
2012 establishments in Australia